Epinotia illepidosa is a species of moth of the family Tortricidae. It is found in Morona-Santiago Province, Ecuador.

The wingspan is about 23 mm. The forewings are pale brownish, suffused with brown and with traces of markings. The hindwings are whitish, mixed with brownish in the distal area and with pale brownish strigulation (fine streaks).

Etymology
The species name refers to the colouration of the species and is derived from Latin illepidosus (meaning without a charm).

References

Moths described in 2006
Eucosmini